Giannis Mantzourakis (born 6 June 1949) is a Greek professional football manager and former player.

Early life
Born in Romania to a Greek father and Romanian mother. His father an ethnic Greek and communist fighter was a refugee from the Greek civil war, who lived in Bucharest, right after the second World war.

Mantzourakis speaks fluent Romanian and he also holds a Romanian citizenship.

Playing career
Mantzourakis began his youth football career with Şcoala Sportivă 2 București where he met Mircea Lucescu who was three years older than him. He made his senior debut in Cluj-Napoca the birthplace of his mother playing for CFR Cluj in the Romanian Second Division in 1967. Mantzourakis helped his side to get promoted to the Romanian First Division becoming the team's top goalscorer in the 1968–69 season. Right after their promotion, Mantzourakis left Cluj to play for Rapid Bucharest. In the same year he played for the Olympic team of Romania under head coach Dumitru Teodorescu.

In 1970, he moved to Greece and played for PAOK FC winning the Greek Cup in 1972 and later he was transferred to A.E. Larissa where he spent the most of his career.

Mantzourakis was signed by Spanish Segunda División side Terrassa in the 1975–76 season, but unfortunately didn't get to play any match. In the summer of 1977 he played abroad in the National Soccer League with Toronto Panhellenic.

He ended his career with Iraklis at the age of 31.

Managerial career
Mantzourakis began his career as a coach in the 1980s, by coaching first Egaleo FC and then he coached Chalkida and Kavala. Then, in 1987–88 he went to Cyprus and coached APOP Paphos and later for Pezoporikos. Returning to his country the following season he was coach of Naousa. As a coach, he won his first title with his team APOEL, which coached them in 1989–90, when he went back to Cyprus. That season APOEL became champions.

For three years, since 1990 he was coach for Pierikos but then he went back to Cyprus and to his previous team APOEL in 1993 until 1995.

Returning to Greece, he coached Larissa, in 1995–96 and then he employed for Skoda Xanthi. He coached the team for four years until 1999 and he returned to the team in 2004 for two years. It is considered that his best work was for Xanthi with their chairman Christos Panopoulos. The second time when he worked for them, Xanthi achieved their greatest success in their history. As a coach of the team, Xanthi became 5th in 2005–06, a position which gave them the right to play in UEFA Cup.

The greatest moment in his career was with Olympiacos in 1999–2000 became champions and the following season when he coached the "Legend of Piraeus" in UEFA Champions League.

Olympiacos Piraeus
On 9 April 2000, the day of the Greek parliament elections, Olympiacos' chairman Sokratis Kokkalis sacked manager Alberto Bigon. Matzourakis was the manager of Skoda Xanthi by this time, but on 10 April 2000, one day after Bigon left, Matzourakis signed for 1,5-year in Olympiacos.

By this time, Olympiacos was first in the league with 68 points, 1 point over Panathinaikos. Mantzourakis promised he will lead the team to 8 wins in the 8 remaining matches, that meant Olympiacos wins the championship.

His first match in the team was against Iraklis at OAKA. Olympiacos started the game well, they had many misses, but they won only 1–0 with a goal by Luciano de Souza in the 90+2 minute. Olympiacos continued winning and remained first, although Panathinaikos lost 1–0 away to Panahaiki and Matzourakis' team, with 8 wins in 8 games, celebrated its fourth consecutive championship.

In the summer transfer period, Zlatko Zahovic was transferred to Valencia FC, although other
high-class players, such as Ze Elias, Grigoris Georgatos (on loan from Inter), Par Zetterberg, Christian Karembeu, Gabriel Alvez and the young Nery Castillo, moved to Olympiacos. With these additions, Matzourakis' team became more powerful and celebrated wins over Olympique Lyonnais (2–1) and Valencia FC (1–0) at home in the 2000–01 Champions League. Although, Olympiacos was unable to win away, and due to a loss to Heerenveen S.C. 1–0 in the Netherlands, the Greek champions finished 3rd with 9 points and failed to qualify to the second round. Due to this, Olympiacos fans were booing Matzourakis in the match against Liverpool F.C. (2–2) for the UEFA Cup.

In the final match of the group stage against Olympique Lyonnais at Gerland, Matzourakis made a substitution changing Giovanni, and the Brazilian attacked his coach verbally, with Matzourakis responding. This incident forced the fans to boo Olympiacos' coach at the match against Liverpool.

This, along with an argue with Lampros Choutos, forced Matzourakis to leave the club, while Olympiacos was first in the league, 4 points over Panathinaikos and AEK. His successor Takis Lemonis continued, winning the championship 12 points over Panathinaikos and 17 points over AEK.

After 2000
Back in Cyprus in 2002, he coached Anorthosis Famagusta and AEL Limassol, and in 2003, AEL qualified to the Cypriot Cup final after 14 years, and was beaten on penalties by Anorthosis 5–3 after a draw 0–0.

After working in Xanthi for two years, he gave up by coaching the team on 26 September 2006, after the bad results of the team. He returned to Cyprus in January 2007, this time for AC Omonia, replacing their previous coach Ioan Andone without success. He was fired after his team was beaten in the Cypriot Cup Final by Anorthosis Famagusta.

On 14 December 2007 he was appointed manager of Veria, and his spell there was followed by good results. The team escaped the relegation zone, but on 11 March 2008 he was sacked after a home loss to his former club Olympiacos 0–1. Rumours suggested that Matzourakis will become the manager of Olympiacos for the second time after he left Veria, because Olympiacos' coach Takis Lemonis was also sacked after that match. However, Jose Segura succeeded Lemonis at Olympiacos, and Veria was relegated after Matzourakis left.

After that season, Matzourakis returned to Xanthi, but he was sacked before the start of the 2008–09 season. On 20 November 2008 he became the coach of OFI Crete but he could not prevent the team from relegation and was sacked after the end of the season. On 22 September 2009 he once again returned to Xanthi, although the team's results were disappointing and he was sacked on 23 February 2010.

In March 2011 he signed as the head coach of Kavala's local team, Kavala FC. His debut was not good, because his team lost 0–1 from Olympiakos Volou. In April, he was quit from the Macedonian Team and his last match with Kavala, was Kavala versus Atromitos.

On 5 March 2012 he signed as the head coach of AEL Kallonis and for the first time in his career, he would coach a team playing in the Football League. He managed to achieve promotion to the Superleague, as well as securing relegation-safe status in the club's first season in the competition, despite playing all home games at neutral ground. The next season however, the club's board of directors surprisingly terminated Mantzourakis' contract in mid-season in favour of Vangelis Vlachos, who was hired a day later.

On 12 February 2015, Mantzourakis was appointed head coach of competing Superleague side Ergotelis. Not two weeks later, on 25 February 2015 Mantzourakis resigned his position. In this short period, he coached the club in two crucial competition matches, recording a draw against Panionios and a loss against Atromitos.

On 8 October 2015, he was appointed head coach of Panetolikos. He led the team to 11th place in the 2015–2016 Greek Superleague and his contract was renewed for the 2016–17 season. On 17 January 2017, he parted ways with Panetolikos.

Managing career

References

1948 births
Living people
Footballers from Bucharest
Greek footballers
Greek expatriate footballers
Greek football managers
Greek people of Romanian descent
Athlitiki Enosi Larissa F.C. managers
Olympiacos F.C. managers
AC Omonia managers
Anorthosis Famagusta F.C. managers
AEL Limassol managers
CFR Cluj players
FC Rapid București players
PAOK FC players
Athlitiki Enosi Larissa F.C. players
Terrassa FC footballers
Iraklis Thessaloniki F.C. players
Expatriate football managers in Cyprus
Expatriate footballers in Spain
Canadian National Soccer League players
Liga I players
Super League Greece players
Super League Greece managers
OFI Crete F.C. managers
APOEL FC managers
Veria F.C. managers
Ergotelis F.C. managers
Panetolikos F.C. managers
APOP Paphos FC managers
Association football forwards
Greek expatriate football managers